The Devils Backbone Brewing Company is a brewpub located in Roseland, Virginia, owned by Anheuser-Busch InBev. It was established in 2008 by Steven Crandall. In 2012, a 15,000 square foot production facility and tap room, referred to as "The Outpost", was established near Lexington, Virginia. In 2016, the company was purchased by Anheuser-Busch InBev, meaning that Devils Backbone Brewing Company would no longer meet the Brewers Association definition of a "craft brewery", since ownership by Anheuser-Busch InBev exceeds the definition's 25% maximum ownership by a non-craft brewery.

History 
Steven and Heidi Crandall founded the Devils Backbone Brewery Company in 2008. The brewing facility was built on a  property surrounded by the Blue Ridge Mountains. The brewery takes its name from the ridge named by Thomas Jefferson's father, who surveyed the Blue Ridge Mountains.

In 2016, Anheuser-Busch acquired Devils Backbone Brewing Company.

Locations 
Devils Backbone operates two main breweries in Virginia: The Outpost Brewery & Tap Room, located in Lexington, Virginia, and Basecamp, located in Roseland, Virginia.

Select brews can also be found in Pennsylvania, West Virginia, North Carolina, Tennessee, Maryland, Washington, D.C., and Delaware. Since the purchase by Anheuser-Busch, the company has expanded into the markets of South Carolina, Georgia, Florida, Kentucky, Ohio, Pennsylvania, New Jersey, New York, and Tennessee.

Beers 
Devils Backbone produces approximately 128 different beers. In 2015, the company produced close to 62,000 barrels of beer. The following year, 75,000 barrels were produced. The beer is produced with a traditional German-style brewing system. Since 2016, the company began to release both the Vienna Lager and the Eight Point IPA in 12-ounce cans.

Vienna Lager 

One of the most notable beers brewed by the company, Vienna Lager, was included in Men's Journal "Best 100 Beers in the World," and by Food & Wine "50 Best American Lagers." The lager took up nearly 60% of the company's volume in 2015.

Awards 

 2015 Great American Beer Festival - Gold
 2012 Great American Beer Festival - Gold
 2014 World Beer Cup Silver
 2014 Virginia Craft Brewers Fest Gold

Eight Point IPA 
The Eight Point IPA was the first beer that was brewed at Devils Backbone. The beer is among the company's Backbone Basecamp Favorites lineup.

Danzig 
The Baltic-style porter has been brewed since 2009. It is one of the most popular beers in Devils Backbone Trail Blazers series. The porter has earned several awards.

Awards 

 2013 Great American Beer Festival - Bronze
 2012 Great American Beer Festival - Silver
 2010 World Beer Cup - Gold
 2009 Great American Beer Festival - Silver

List of beers brewed

Awards 
Over the years, Devils Backbone Brewing Company has earned high recognition in the brewing industry. Since opening in 2008, the company has won 28 medals at the Great American Beer Festival in Denver, Colorado.

National Titles

The Great American Beer Festival 
 2014 Great American Beer Festival Mid-Size Brewery & Brewery Team
 2013 Small Brewing Company & Small Brewing Company Team
 2012 Small Brewpub & Small Brewpub Brewer
 2010 World Beer Cup Champion Brewery
 Virginia Craft Brewers Fest Best of Show Medals: 2015, 2014, 2013 & 2012

World Beer Cup 
 2016 Won a Gold Award in the German-Style Schwarzbier category
 2016 Won a Gold Award in the Irish-Style Red Ale

Australian International Beer Awards

Virginia Craft Brewers Fest

References

External links 
 Devils Backbone Brewing Company

Beer brewing companies based in Virginia
Nelson County, Virginia
American companies established in 2008
Food and drink companies established in 2008
2008 establishments in Virginia